M. V. Pylee (5 October 1919 - 30 December 2017) was an Indian scholar, educationist and management guru, considered by many as the father of management education in Kerala and an authority on Constitutional Law. He was awarded Padmabhushan in 2006 by Government of India for his contributions to the fields of education and management.

Biography
Moolamattom Varkey Pylee was born in Pulinkunnoo on 5 October 1919. 

His wife, Elsie Pylee, died in 2004. 
An award has been instituted by Cochin University of Science and Technology, the M. V. Pylee Award, given once in three years, carrying a cash prize of Rs 200,000, a memento and citation for excellence in teaching and research and contribution to academic community.

Cochin University of Science and Technology, St. Berchman's College, Changanacherry, St. Joseph's School Pulimkunnu, St. Agnus College, Mangalore, Kerala Higher Education Trust, Good Samaritan project, India and others have benefitted from the Trust endowments.

Works
M. V. Pylee authored several books in English and Malayalam.

In English

In Malayalam
 Sevanathinte Rajapathayil – Autobiography
 Russiayile Kazchakalum Anubhavangalum
 Vidybhyasa Prasnangal, Innale, Innu, Naale
 Managementil Thozilali Pankalitham
 Videshathuninnum Kure Kathukal
 Indian Bharanaghatana
 Rashtrapathi Prathikuttil
 Indiayude Bharanaghatana Charitram
 Unnata Vidyabhyasam Punarudharikkan
 Bharathathinte Bharanaghatanakku Oru Amukham
 Vyavasayam Americayil 
 Indian Rashtriyathile Nootana Pravanatakal
 Tourism Americayil

He also published over 200 research papers in various journals.

Awards

 Fulbright Smith-mundt Scholar at Harvard University (1953–54).

References

External links
 Excerpts in Economic and Political Weekly
 In Business week
 Profile on S. Chand & Co web site
 
 Profile on DCSMAT web site
 List of Books on All Book Stores
 List of Books on Biblio
 M.V. Pylee passes away

Further reading
 
 
 
 

1922 births
Malayali people
Recipients of the Padma Bhushan in literature & education
2017 deaths
Scholars from Kerala
20th-century Indian educational theorists
Indian political writers
Harvard Law School alumni
Indian male writers
Malayalam-language writers
English-language writers from India
Indian business writers
People from Alappuzha district
Indian autobiographers